Arthurstown is a small village in the townland of Coleman in southwest County Wexford, Ireland. It is located along the R733 regional road on the eastern shore of the Waterford Harbour estuary, where The Three Sisters flow into the sea. As of the 2016 census, the town had a population of 127.

Located between Ballyhack and Duncannon, Arthurstown is home to a pub and service station.

See also
 List of towns and villages in the Republic of Ireland
 Marquess of Donegall

References

Towns and villages in County Wexford